Pigeon House Mountain (Aboriginal: Didthul) is a mountain at an elevation of   on the Budawang Range that is situated within the Morton National Park, located on the South Coast region of New South Wales, Australia.

The prominent remnant of a two tier sandstone structure, the nearest town is Milton. Pigeon House Mountain is a popular walking destination, taking an average of three to four hours for a complete ascent and descent from the car park.

Pigeon House Mountain is home to eastern grey kangaroos and superb lyrebirds.

Etymology
The mountain was first seen by Captain James Cook at 7 a.m. on 21 April 1770, during his voyage of discovery along Australia's eastern coast. Cook described -

The Aboriginal name for the mountain is Didthul, Didhol, or Dithol which means "woman's breast" on account of the distinctive shape of the mountain.

Gallery

See also

Breast-shaped hill

References

Mountains of New South Wales
Southern Tablelands
South Coast (New South Wales)